The 2017–18 season was Reading's 147th year in existence and fifth consecutive season in the Championship, and covers the period from 1 July 2017 to 30 June 2018.

Season review

Pre-season

On 31 May, Reading announced that they would be returning to the Netherlands for a 10-day training camp.
On 6 June, Reading announced that they would host two behind-doors friendlies with QPR at the club's Hogwood Park training facility, with the fixtures taking place on 8 July.

On 16 June 2017, Reading were given a home tie against League One side Gillingham in the EFL Cup first round draw. In the following days, it was announced that the match would take place on 8 August.

For the second year in a row, Reading accepted the invitation to enter their Category One academy into the EFL Trophy.

On 4 July 2017, manager Jaap Stam signed a new two-year contract with Reading, keeping him at the club until 2019. The club's assistant manager, 
Andries Ulderink, and first team coach, Said Bakkati, also signed new deals to extend their stay. Chief Executive Nigel Howe was elected to the EFL Board on the same day. The following day, defender Chris Gunter committed his future to the club by signing a new three-year contract extension.

On 6 July, Reading announced that whilst they are in the Netherlands on their pre-season tour, they will play in friendlies against K.V. Kortrijk, of the Belgian top flight, and Turkish Süper Lig club Gençlerbirliği on 15 July, and Dutch Eredivisie team Sparta Rotterdam and Belgian second tier side Cercle Brugge on 22 July. The same day, Liam Kelly joined Stam and Gunter by extending his contract until 2020; youngsters Sam Smith, Ryan East, Jake Sheppard, Lewis Ward and Andy Rinomhota all agreed new deal; Liam Driscoll, Ben House, Joel Rollinson and Ade Shokunbi moved unto the U-23s from the U18's whilst Ethan Coleman, Tom Holmes and Kosta Sparta signed professional deals.

On 27 July, Steven Reid left the club to pursue new coaching opportunities and challenges.

On 29 July, Reading hosted KNVB Cup winners SBV Vitesse in a friendly match at Wycombe Wanderers' Adams Park. The venue was chosen due to the renovation of the pitch at the Madejski Stadium. The match, which was Reading's only pre-season friendly to take place in front of spectators in the UK, saw Reading lose 3–2.

On 31 July, John Swift signed a new five-year contract with Reading, keeping him at the club until 2022, whilst Liam Moore signed a new four-year deal on 2 August.

Transfers
Following the conclusion of the 2016–17 regular season, Reading announced on 16 May 2016 that they would not be renewing the contracts of Aaron Kuhl, Harrison Bennett, Stuart Moore, Joe Tupper, Terence Vancooten, Sean Long, Craig Tanner, Jack Denton and Harry Cardwell. Long went on to sign for Lincoln City on 18 May, whilst Dominic Hyam agreed to join Coventry City on 24 May.

On 19 June, Tarique Fosu moved permanently to Charlton Athletic after turning down a new contract at Reading.

On 26 June, Reading announced that two academy players would be leaving the club. Zak Jules had turned down a new contract with the club and had signed for Shrewsbury Town, while Jack Stacey had moved to Luton Town on a permanent deal. Additionally, two players left the club on loan on the same day. Deniss Rakels completed his move to Lech Poznań for the season and Jonathan Bond transferred to Peterborough United until 3 January 2018.
On 28 June, Reading announced their first signing of the summer, Pelle Clement on a three-year contract from AFC Ajax.

On 1 July, Niall Keown moved to Partick Thistle for an undisclosed fee, rejoining the club he spent the second half of the previous season at. The following day, Reading announced that Andrija Novakovich had signed a new 2-year contract with the club and that he would spend the 2017–18 season on loan at Eerste Divisie side SC Telstar. On 4 July, Danzell Gravenberch moved to K.S.V. Roeselare on a season-long loan deal.

The contract of Danny Williams was not extended, despite a contract offer being made by Reading. He was officially released by the club on 1 July, signing for Premier League newcomers Huddersfield Town four days later.

Yakou Méïte signed a season-long loan deal with Sochaux on 8 July.

Reading completed their second signing of the summer on 14 July, Jón Daði Böðvarsson signing on a three-year contract from Wolverhampton Wanderers. Two days later, Saudi club Al-Hilal confirmed the signing of Ali Al-Habsi on a three-year contract, with Reading confirming the move on 17 July. Academy graduate Dominic Samuel left the club on 19 July, signing a three-year deal with Blackburn Rovers for an undisclosed fee, whilst Vito Mannone joined the club on a three-year contract from Sunderland for £2,000,000. Paolo Hurtado left the club on 20 July, having played 6 times for the Royals in his two-year spell, returning to Vitória de Guimarães on a permanent deal for an undisclosed fee.

Reading announced that Jake Cooper had signed for Millwall on a permanent deal on 28 July 2017. On 1 August, Robert Dickie joined Lincoln City on loan until January 2018, whilst Lewis Ward moved to Hungerford Town on loan until the end of February 2018.

Modou Barrow became Reading's fourth summer signing on 3 August, signing a four-year deal, before young goalkeeper Luke Southwood joined Bath City on a six-month loan deal the next day. On 11 August, youngsters Cameron Green and Conor Davis joined Basingstoke Town on an initial one-month loan, with Leandro Bacuna became Reading's fifth summer arrival, signing a four-year deal, on 13 August. Reading transfer dealings then went quiet for two weeks before announced the signing of David Edwards on a two-year contract from Wolverhampton Wanderers on 26 August.

Three days later, 29 August, Reading signed Sone Aluko to a four-year contract, moving from Fulham for an undisclosed fee, with Sandro Wieser joining K.S.V. Roeselare on a season-long load deal on 31 August, transfer deadline day.

August
Reading started the season, on 5 August, with a 0–2 away defeat to Queens Park Rangers, Conor Washington gave QPR the lead in the 22nd minute before doubling his, and QPR's, goals on from the penalty spot on the 59th minute after Tiago Ilori earned a red card for the challenge on Pawel Wszolek. Three days later Reading faced Gillingham in the first round of the EFL Cup, winning 2–0 thanks to two Liam Kelly goals. Andy Rinomhota and Sam Smith made their debuts for Reading from the start whilst Axel Andrésson also made his debut, coming on as a second-half substitute. Reading's first home league game came on 12 August against Fulham, where Tomáš Kalas was shown a straight red card in the 1st minute for pulling back Modou Barrow. Liam Kelly then gave Reading the lead in the 61st minute with his third goal of the season, before former Reading player Lucas Piazon equalised in the 82nd minute to give Fulham the draw. Reading followed up their first point of the season with a trip to Aston Villa on 15 August. The game finished 2–1 to Reading with the lead coming after an Adrian Popa cross deflected off Glenn Whelan into his own net in the 49th minute. Modou Barrow extended Readings lead 6 minutes later with his first goal for the club, before Conor Hourihane pulled a goal back late on. Reading suffered their second defeat of the season away to Preston North End on 19 August, with the only goal of the game being scored by Jordan Hugill in the 22nd minute. Reading got back to winning ways on 22 August, with a 3–1 extra time victory over Millwall in the Second Round of the EFL Cup. Shane Ferguson cancelled out Leandro Bacuna's first goal for the club, before George Evans scored on the stroke of half time in extra and Sam Smith scored his first goal for Reading with 4 minutes to go. Reading traveled to St Andrew's on 26 August to face Birmingham City, with goals from Jón Daði Böðvarsson and George Evans securing the three-points. On 30 August, Reading announced that Jordan Obita had signed a new three-year contract with the club, and that skipper Paul McShane extending his contract until 2019.

On 31 August Reading's home game against Barnsley, due to take place on 12 September, was postponed as Barnsley's Second Round EFL Cup match against Derby County was moved to the same date.

September
At the start of September Young keeper Liam Driscoll joined Staines Town on loan. Readings first game of September took place on the 9th, with Bristol City visiting the Madejski Stadium and leaving with a 1–0 win after Aden Flint scored an 84th-minute winner for the visitors. On 8 September, Reading confirmed that their home game against Barnsley, originally scheduled for 12 September, had been re-arranged for 28 November. Readings next game was on 16 September, away to Brentford. Brentford took the lead in the 16th minute through Josh Clarke before Liam Moore was fouled in the box and Liam Kelly slotted the equaliser in from the spot to earn Reading a point. On 19 September Reading hosted Swansea City in the Third round of the EFL Cup. After a goalless first half Alfie Mawson broke the deadlock with near post header from a corner in the 52nd minute before a George Evans pass struck the referee, Andy Davies in the centre circle, with ball breaking to Swansea and Jordan Ayew finishing the move off to see Swansea City win 2–0 and advance into the next round. On 23 September Reading hosted Hull City, after a first half Fraizer Campbell goal for the visitors, substitute Jón Daði Böðvarsson scored in the 87th minute to give both teams a point. Reading lost to Millwall on the 26th at The Den. Dave Edwards gave Reading the lead in the 73rd minute with his first goal for the club, before George Saville scored twice in the last 10 minutes to had the hosts all three points. On 27 September, Joey van den Berg extended his contract with Reading until the summer of 2019. On 30 September, Reading hosted Norwich City in a live Sky Sports game. Norwich took the lead through James Maddison in the 10th minute, with Liam Moore equalising a few minutes later to leave the teams level at half time. Early in the second half Cameron Jerome scored the winner for Norwich with Marley Watkins being sentoff for a dangerous tackle on Chris Gunter in stoppage time.

October
Reading started October with an away trip to Leeds United, on 14 October. Reading took the lead through former Leeds loanee Modou Barrow in the 84th minute, before Vito Mannone saved a 91st minute Pablo Hernández penalty to give Reading the win. The following Saturday, 21st, Reading faced Sheffield United at Bramall Lane. The Blades went 2–0 up before halftime with goals from Paul Coutts and Billy Sharp, before Roy Beerens gave Reading hope of a point with a late consolation goal to end the game 2–1 to Sheffield United. Middlesbrough were the visitors to the Madejski Stadium on 28 October, and ran out 2–0 winners over Reading thanks to a Grant Leadbitter first half penalty and Britt Assombalonga early in the second half. Reading's last game of October was a home game against Nottingham Forest on 31 October. John Swift gave Reading the lead in the 10th minute before scoring his, and Reading's second midway through the second half. Sone Aluko scored his first Reading goal in the 78th minute to give Reading a 3–0 lead, before Ben Osborn scored a late consolation goal for Nottingham Forest in the final 5 minutes, leaving Reading 3–1 winners.

November
On 1 November, Reading announced that Yann Kermorgant had put off his retirement plans at the end of the season to sign a new contract with the club until the summer of 2019. Three days later Reading traveled to Pride Park to face Derby. Reading took a 2–0 half time lead after goals from Liam Moore and Sone Aluko inside the first 15 minutes. Roy Beerens extended the lead to 3–0 just before the hour mark, with Johnny Russell pulling one back for Derby in the 71st minute. Modou Barrow scored his third goal for Reading 4 minutes later to restore Readings 3 goal advantage with Chris Martin scoring Derbys second in injury time to leave Reading taking all 3 points. On 9 November, Lewis Ward returned to Reading from his loan deal with Hungerford Town earl as an unconfirmed higher league club had made an inquiry into taking him on loan, joining Aldershot Town on loan until 3 January the following day. After the international break, Reading hosted Wolverhampton Wanderers on 18 November, with the visitors running out 2–0 winners thanks to goals from Ivan Cavaleiro and Matt Doherty. Readings 17th game of the season was a midweek fixture away to Bolton Wanderers on 21 November. The home side took a 2–0 lead with goals from Reece Burke and Darren Pratley inside the first 25 minutes, whilst Reading also lost John Swift to injury. In the second half Reading pulled two goals back in the last 15 minutes, from Liam Moore and a Leandro Bacuna penalty, to end the game 2–2. On 24 November, Conor Davis joined Gosport Borough on loan, with Reading following up their draw away at Bolton with a home draw against Sheffield Wednesday the following day, 25 November, leaving them 18th in the table. On 28 November Reading hosted Barnsley in their re-arranged home game from 12 September, first half goals from Dave Edwards, and a Joey van den Berg screamer gave Reading a 2–0 half time lead. In the second-half substitute Jón Daði Böðvarsson came on and rounded off the scoring to give Reading a 3–0 win that lifted them into 16th position in the league. On 30 November, Reading announced that Omar Richards had signed a new deal with club until 2021.

December
Reading started December with a 3–1 away victory over Sunderland on 2 December. The game saw Callum McManaman sent off for two yellow cards before half time, before goals from David Edwards and two from Modou Barrow saw Reading take a 3–0 lead before former Royals loanee Lewis Grabban scored a late penalty. On 4 December, Reading were drawn away to Stevenage in the Third Round of the FA Cup. On 6 December, Axel Andrésson joined Torquay United on a one-month youth loan deal until 6 January 2018. Two days later, Andy Rinomhota signed a new contract with Reading until the summer of 2021.
Reading's second game of December was a home match against Cardiff City, originally scheduled for 15:00hrs on 9 December, the game was moved to 20:00hrs on 11 December so it could be shown on Sky Sports. Reading took a 2–0 lead going into half time, thanks to an own goal from Callum Paterson and Modou Barrow's third goal of the month, with former Reading defender Sean Morrison also going off injured. With less than 10 minutes to go Neil Warnock was sent-off for Cardiff City, before goals from Joe Bennett and Lee Tomlin rescued a point for the visitors. On 16 December, Ipswich Town scored two first half goal, through Callum Connolly and Joe Garner, at Portman Road to inflict Readings ninth defeat of the season. On 21 December, Josh Barrett signed a new contract with Reading, until the summer of 2021, whilst also agreeing to join EFL League Two side Coventry City on loan 1 January 2018, until the end of the season. On 23 December, Reading hosted Burton Albion in a 1–2 defeat which saw Burton Albion take the lead through Tom Flanagan in the 40th minute. Modou Barrow equalised for Reading in the 76th minute before Tom Naylor scored the winner for Burton in the 81st minute. Reading lost their third game in a row on 26 December, away to Bristol City, with both Bristol goals coming in the second half, from Jamie Paterson in the 68th minute and Lloyd Kelly in 93rd minute. On 30 December, Jake Sheppard joined Guiseley on loan for the remainder of the season. Reading's last game of 2017 was away to Barnsley in a game that ended 1–1 after Ethan Pinnock scored a stoppage time equaliser for the home side to rule out a second half Yann Kermorgant strike.

January
On 2 January, Reading hosted Birmingham City in a game that ended 0–2 to the visitors, with the goals coming from Jacques Maghoma and Sam Gallagher. On 5 January, Academy Manager Lee Heron left the club explore new opportunities. Reading traveled to Stevenage on 6 January for their FA Cup Third round match, with the match ending 0–0, forcing a reply at the Madejski Stadium on 16 January.

Reading drew 0–0 away at Hull City on 13 January, before winning 3–0 against Stevenage in their Third round reply thanks to a Jón Daði Böðvarsson hattrick. Following Reading's 3–0 victory over Stevenage, their away match against Burton Albion was rearranged to 30 January due to it now clashing with the clubs FA Cup Fourth Round match against Sheffield Wednesday. Reading suffered their defeat in their next Championship fixture, a 0–1 home defeat against Brentford on 20 January, with Lasse Vibe scoring the goal.

Reading were knocked out of the 2017–18 FA Cup on 26 January, losing 3–1 to Sheffield Wednesday at Hillsborough. Sheffield Wednesday took a 3–0 lead thanks to two goals from Atdhe Nuhiu and one from George Boyd before Cameron Dawson turned into his own net to give Reading a consolation goal. Reading's first league victory in eight games came on 30 January, in their rearranged fixture against Burton Albion from 27 January. Reading traveled to Burton Albion's Pirelli Stadium where two goals from Jón Daði Böðvarsson and one from Chris Gunter secured the points for the Royals, with Lucas Akins scoring a penalty for the hosts.

Transfers
On 3 January, goalkeepers Jonathan Bond and Luke Southwood both extended their respective loan deals with, Peterborough United and Bath City, until the end of the season, whilst with youngsters Gabriel Osho and Thomas McIntyre signing new contracts, until the summer of 2020, on the same day. The next day, 4 January, Lewis Ward extended his loan deal with Aldershot Town until 4 March, whilst Robert Dickie moved to Oxford United on a permanent transfer for an undisclosed fee.
On 17 January, Reading confirmed that Deniss Rakels' loan deal with Lech Poznań had ended, and that Rakels had joined Cracovia on loan for the remainder of the season. Two days later, 19 January, Ade Shokunbi joined Nuneaton Town on a youth-loan until 17 February.

On 29 January, Adrian Popa joined Al-Taawoun on loan for the remainder of the season, whilst Tommy Elphick joined the club on loan for the remainder of the season from Aston Villa.
On transfer deadline day, 31 January, Chris Martin joined the club on loan until the end of the season, whilst George Legg joined Barnet on loan for the remainder of the season and Roy Beerens joined Vitesse permanently.

February
On 1 February, Tennai Watson signed a new contract until the summer 2021, with Sam Smith follow suit by also signing a new contract until 2021. On 3 February Reading hosted Millwall, losing 0–2 after an own goal from Leandro Bacuna in the 70th minute followed by a second goal 3 minutes later from Lee Gregory. On 5 February, Reading announced that Former Premier League EPPP chief, Ged Roddy MBE, had been appointed as the club's new academy manager.
Reading traveled to Middlesbrough on 10 February, losing 2–1 to goal either side of halftime from Adama Traoré and a consolation goal from loanee Chris Martin whilst Britt Assombalonga also missed a late penalty for the hosts. On 20 February, Reading traveled to the City Ground to face Nottingham Forest, taking the lead through Omar Richards in the 35th minute before Lee Tomlin equalised in the 84th minute to share the points between the two teams.
On 23 February, U23 captain Gabriel Osho joined Maidenhead United on a one-month youth loan deal. The following day, 24 February, Reading hosted Derby County in a six-goal thriller. Derby County took the lead in the 6th minute through Kasey Palmer before Liam Kelly equalised 10 minutes later. Modou Barrow gave Reading the lead in the 32nd minute with Richard Keogh level the game three minutes later to seeing the game in to half time at 2–2. Tom Lawrence regained the lead for Derby County in the first minute of the second half, with the final equaliser coming in the 80th minute from Jón Daði Böðvarsson before Chris Baird was shown a red card late on for rash challenge on Barrow.
On 27 February, Jake Sheppard returned from his loan deal at Guiseley, before Reading suffered defeat to Sheffield United at home later in the evening. Billy Sharp gave the visitors the lead in the 11th minute, with Mark Duffy extending the lead in the 44th, giving Sheffield United a 2–0 half time lead. Omar Richards scored his second of the season early in the second half to reduce the deficit, before Leandro Bacuna missed a 62nd-minute penalty and Billy Sharp scored his second of the game, and Sheffield Uniteds third, a minute later to wrap up the points.

March
Reading's first scheduled game was due to be played on 3 March against Wolverhampton Wanderers at Molineux, however the game was postponed on the morning of the 3rd due to adverse weather conditions leaving the pitch unplayable, with the match being rescheduled for 13 March. On 7 March, Lewis Ward extended his loan deal with Aldershot Town until the end of the season. On 6 March Reading hosted Bolton Wanderers in a 1–1 draw which saw former Royal Adam Le Fondre equalise for Bolton on half time to cancel out an earlier Modou Barrow strike. Reading drew their fourth game in five on, coming from behind to draw 2–2 with Leeds United at the Madejski Stadium on 10 March. Jón Daði Böðvarsson put Reading ahead in the 16th minute before Pontus Jansson and Pablo Hernández either side of halftime gave Leeds a 2–1 lead, before an Eunan O'Kane own goal gave both sides a point. On 12 March, Jake Sheppard joined Wealdstone on loan until the end of the season.

Reading's rearranged match away to Wolverhampton Wanderers took place on 13 March, Matt Doherty scoring either side of Benik Afobe to give Wolverhampton Wanderers a 3–0 win. On 15 March, Reading announced that goalkeeper Liam Driscoll and forward Ben House had signed new contract with club until the summer of 2020.

Reading traveled to Norwich City on 17 March, losing 3–2 after being 3–1 down at half time. Mario Vrančić opened the scoring for Norwich in the 14th minute, before Grant Hanley extended it in the 26th with Liam Kelly pulling a goal back in the 32nd minute. Anssi Jaakkola brought down James Maddison in the 36th, with Maddison picking himself up to slot away the penalty to make it 3–1 at halftime. Sam Smith finished of the scoring in the 51st minute to end the game 3–2 to Norwich. On 21 March, manager Jaap Stam left the club with immediate effect. The following day, 22 March, youth goalkeeper Jökull Andrésson joined Camberley Town on loan. Reading announced the appointment of Paul Clement as the club's new manager on 23 March. Reading hosted Queens Park Rangers for Paul Clement's first match in charge of Reading. An early Sone Aluko goal proved to be the difference with second-half substitute Yann Kermorgant being sentoff in the 81st minute for two yellow cards.

April
Reading traveled to Aston Villa on 3 April in a game that they lost 3–0. Midfielder David Edwards was given a first half red card after picking up two bookings in the first 30 minutes of the game. Shortly after half time Birkir Bjarnason broke the deadlock with Conor Hourihane and Scott Hogan adding to the tally later in the game. Reading won their second game under Paul Clement on 7 April, a 1–0 victory over Preston North End thanks to a first half strike by Modou Barrow. Reading traveled to Fulham on 10 April, suffering a 1–0 defeat after Stefan Johansen scored in the 25th minute and Leandro Bacuna was sentoff in the 93rd minute, Readings third red card in four games. 14 April saw Reading host Sunderland at the Madejski Stadium, taking the lead through a Liam Kelly penalty in the 20th minute. After halftime, Paddy McNair and Lee Cattermole scored to give Sunderland the lead before substitute Yann Kermorgant came on and scored to grab a point for Reading. Readings penultimate away trip of the season was to Hillsborough to face Sheffield Wednesday on 21 April. Sheffield Wednesday took the lead in the 34th minute through Fernando Forestieri, before George Boyd extended the lead in the 52nd. Forestieri grabbed his second goal of the match and Wednesdays third in the 73rd minute before Tyler Blackett was sentoff for Reading in the 76th minute and the game ended 3–0 to Sheffield Wednesday.

Reading suffered their heaviest defeat of the season in their last home game of the season, a 4–0 defeat by Ipswich Town on 28 April. Ipswich Town's goals came courtesy of Martyn Waghorn in the 71st minute, Jordan Spence in the 79th, Freddie Sears in the 91st and Callum Connolly in the 94th.

May
Reading's final game of the season was away to Cardiff City on 5 May, with the hosts needing to equal or better Fulhams result away to Birmingham City and Reading needing a draw to survive relegation. The match ended 0–0 resulting in Reading finishing the season in 20th place, 3 points of relegation, with 44 Points and Cardiff being promoted to the Premier League as runners-up.

On 11 May 2018, Reading announced that they had exercised a third-year option clause in Anssi Jaakkola's contract, keeping the goalkeeper at the club until the summer of 2019. Whilst they had also offered contracts to U23 goalkeepers Luke Southwood and Lewis Ward and second year scholars Akin Odimayo, Jamal Balogun and Andre Burley with Moroyin Omolabi, Cameron Green, Jazz Wallace and Jack Nolan all accepting professional contracts with the club. On the same day Reading announced that Stephen Quinn, Joseph Mendes, Jonathan Bond, Deniss Rakels, Conor Davis, Jake Sheppard, Gabriel Rosario, Kosta Sparta, Harry Philby, Jack Buchanan, Leon Okuboyejo and Joseph Wilson will all leave the club at the end of contracts.

On 17 May, Reading announced their first signing of the 2018–19 season, Andy Yiadom signed a four-year contract with Reading, officially joining his new club on 1 July after the expiration of his Barnsley contract.

June
On 1 June 2018, Sandro Wieser was released by mutual consent.

Transfers

In

Out

Loans in

Loans out

 Barrett's move was announced on the above date, but was not active until 1 January 2018.

Released

Squad

Left club during season

Friendlies

Under 23s

Competitions

Championship

League table

Results summary

Results by matchday

Results

EFL Cup

FA Cup

Professional U23 Development League

Table

Results

Play-offs

Premier League International Cup

Group stage

EFL Trophy

Group stage

Squad statistics

Appearances and goals

|-
|colspan="14"|Players away from the club on loan:

|-
|colspan="14"|Players who appeared for Reading but left during the season:

|}

Goal scorers

Clean sheets

Disciplinary record

U21/23 statistics

Appearances and goals

|-
|colspan="14"|Players away from the club on loan:

|-
|colspan="14"|Players who left Reading during the season:
|}

Goal scorers

Disciplinary record

Notes

References

Match reports 

Reading
Reading F.C. seasons